The 1997 Sparkassen Cup was a women's tennis tournament played on indoor carpet courta in Leipzig, Germany that was part of the Tier II category of the 1997 WTA Tour. It was the eighth edition of the tournament and was held from 22 September until 28 September 1997. Second-seeded Jana Novotná won the singles title, her second at the event after 1994.

Finals

Singles

 Jana Novotná defeated  Amanda Coetzer 6–2, 4–6, 6–3
 It was Novotná's 6th title of the year and the 82nd of her career.

Doubles

 Martina Hingis /  Jana Novotná defeated  Yayuk Basuki /  Helena Suková 6–2, 6–2
 It was Hingis' 16th title of the year and the 22nd of her career. It was Novotná's 7th title of the year and the 83rd of her career.

References

External links
 ITF tournament edition details

Sparkassen Cup
Sparkassen Cup (tennis)
1997 in German tennis